Eoin Kelly an Irish hurler who plays as a midfielder at senior level for the London county team.

Born in Lusmagh, County Offaly, Kelly first arrived on the inter-county scene when he linked up with the Offaly senior team, making his debut in the 2010 National Hurling League. He later joined the London senior team.	

At club level Kelly is one-time championship medallist with St Gabriel's. He began his club career with Lusmagh.

Honours
Lusmagh
Offaly Intermediate Hurling Championship (1): 2012

St Gabriel's
London Senior Hurling Championship (1): 2013

References

1988 births
Living people
Irish expatriate sportspeople in England
London inter-county hurlers
Lusmagh hurlers
Offaly inter-county hurlers
St Gabriel's hurlers